The Royal Danish Air Force ranks follow the NATO system of ranks and insignia, as does the rest of the Danish Defence. The ranks used are based on the Royal Air Force, with some minor changes. For example, three strips in the RAF is an OF-4, while only an OF-3 in Denmark.

Current ranks

Officers
The highest officer's rank is OF-9 (General) which is reserved for the Chief of Defence (only when this seat is occupied by an Air Force officer). Similarly, OF-8 (Lieutenant general) is reserved for the Vice Chief of Defence. OF-7 (Major general) is used by the chief of the Air Staff and OF-6 (Brigadegeneral) by the chief of a brigade as well as keepers of high-office positions.

Other ranks
The rank insignia of non-commissioned officers and enlisted personnel.

Additional ranks

Clerical personnel

Historical ranks

Officer ranks

Other ranks

References

External links
 
 

Military ranks of Denmark
Royal Danish Air Force
Denmark